Manaw Festival (Jinghpaw: Manau Poi) is an annual traditional dance festival celebrated by Kachin people. Mostly held at Myitkyina, Kachin State also known as မေနာေျမ ( Manaw Land ) in Myanmar and also celebrated by Kachin people around the world. Manaw is the largest festival in Myitkyina, held at the beginning of January. Manaw Festival is the most significant event for Kachin People. Tribes of Kachin gather together in Manaw ground and dance around the erected Manaw poles. The Manau dance is performed at Manau festivals, which originated as part of the ‘Nat’ or spirit worship of the past.

History 
According to Kachin mythology, Manaw was first performed by Nat, spirits, and birds. Nat, spirits invited living creatures from land to participate in the Manaw dance in heaven. Only birds have participated. Afterward, birds came down to land and they taught humans how to dance Manaw dance.

From another folk-tale, there were 9 Suns appeared on earth. Humans were suffered a lot from that incident. They decided to send birds to heaven for mercy. Birds were performed Manaw dance and sang for Nat, spirits. They were pleasured by their performance and they let them dance Manaw dance on earth. Later, men have emulated the dance from birds and started dance Manaw dance to worship Nat, spirits.

Manaw ( Manau ) was called after the proverb " Masaw Nau Ningsan Jau". 'Masaw Ningsan' means heaven and above. 'Nau', 'Jau', 'Jaw' men give and worship. Manau means worship to God or heaven.

In 1947, a Manau was held to celebrate the end of Japanese occupation. Following independence, the Burmese government helped provide finances for the Myitkyina Manau annually on Kachin State Day up until 1958.

Types of Manaw ( Manau ) 
Manaw dance is celebrated only on the five most important occasions.

 To celebrate victory in war.
 To gather the clans to meet and settle accounts, make plans for the future.
 To commemorate the death of an elder.
 For a housewarming.
 To bring good fortune to new farmlands and cultivation.

There are originally 14 types of Manaw. They are

1. Sut Manau, 2. Kumran Manau, 3.Ninghtan Manau, 4.Padang Manau, 5.Ju Manau, 6.Htingram Manau, 7.Ningshawn Manau, 8.Kumrum Manau, 9.Nausawt Manau, 10.Htinghtang Manau, 11.HKridip Manau, 12. Roidu kaput Manau, 13.Hkindu tep Manau, and 14.Sha Dip Hpawt Manau.

Features of the Manaw

Manaw Patterns (Manau Maka) and Manaw Poles 
Manaw patterns ( Manau Maka ) are signature looks of Manaw Festival and Kachin people. The Manaw poles are a totally of 12 pillars connected and stand in the middle of the Manaw ground. It's high at about 20 meters. Manaw patterns are painted on the Manaw poles. Every pattern on poles has different meanings. Also, the pictures of Sun, Star, Moon, Hornbill, and other animals are painted on Manaw poles. The patterns and designs on poles can be changed depending on different places and occasions.

Dance 
Manaw dance is the rhythmical dance. Manaw Dance is performed by all various tribes of Kachin lead by two chiefs ( Naushawng ) leading. Behind the chiefs, fellow members of various tribes of Kachin follow the moves, dance steps and they have to change the rhythm and footsteps when the chiefs do. In the beginning, men and women are dance separately. Later, they combine in the middle of the Manaw dance. The chiefs move the footsteps by following the patterns of Manaw poles.

Music 
Kachin traditional musical instruments are booming drum ( Bau ) and flute ( Sumpi). The musicians are standing in front of the Manaw poles. The vocals team is singing in a group. The instruments team plays a series of gongs, drums, and traditional reed instruments. The Manaw songs are not always the same. Songs are composed and sing depend on the type of Manaw.

Costume 
The chiefs of the Manaw wear long robes with headdresses of hornbill, peacock feathers and horns. Fellow Kachin people who participated in Manaw dance have to wear tribal traditional dresses. Only those who wear traditional dresses are allowed to participate in Manaw dance. Men have to hold a sword while dancing. Women have to hold handkerchief or big fan.

References 

Festivals in Myanmar
Kachin people